Lensley Hugh Wolfe was Chief Justice of Jamaica from 1996 to 2007.

He was admitted to Lincoln's Inn on January 26, 1960.

References 

Chief justices of Jamaica
Year of birth missing
Year of death missing
21st-century Jamaican judges